The Pratt & Whitney JT3D is an early turbofan aircraft engine derived from the Pratt & Whitney JT3C.  It was first run in 1958 and was first flown in 1959 under a B-45 Tornado test aircraft. Over 8,000 JT3Ds were produced between 1959 and 1985. Most JT3D engines still in service today are used on military aircraft, where the engine is referred to by its US military designation of TF33.

Design and development
Aware of the competition from the Rolls-Royce Conway turbofan, Pratt & Whitney decided to develop the JT3D turbofan from the JT3C turbojet for later deliveries of the Boeing 707 and the Douglas DC-8, then nearing entry into service. A 2-stage fan replaced the first 3 stages of the 9-stage JT3C LP compressor. On the LP turbine, the second stage was enlarged and a third stage added.

Unlike GE with the CJ805-23, Pratt & Whitney had not undertaken any transonic fan research prior to designing the JT3D, so they were unable to incorporate a single stage unit into the specification. Instead P&W designed a 2-stage unit based on some research they had done to support the J91 nuclear turbojet.

On the Boeing 707 the JT3D fan nacelle was relatively short, whereas the Douglas DC-8 installation had a full-length fan cowl. Pratt & Whitney provided a kit whereby JT3Cs could be converted to the JT3D specification, and performance, during an overhaul.

In 1959, important orders for the engine were the Boeing 707-120B and Boeing 720B when American Airlines ordered one 707 powered by JT3D turbofans and KLM ordered a JT3D-powered Douglas DC-8. Earlier 707s and DC-8s had been powered by the JT3C and JT4A turbojets, and the improved efficiency of the turbofan soon attracted the airlines. A JT3D-powered 707-123B and 720-023B (the suffix B was to indicate a turbofan-powered aircraft) entered service with American Airlines on the same day, March 12, 1961.

The Boeing KC-135 Stratotankers were all originally powered by turbojet engines. With the demise of many airline 707s, the United States Air Force took the opportunity to buy the surplus airframes and use the engines to re-fit the KC-135As used by the Air National Guard and reserve squadrons with the civilian JT3D (designated TF33-PW-102). Over 150 aircraft were modified and the former KC-135A was re-designated the KC-135E.

After long service for both airlines and air forces, the number of JT3D-powered aircraft is steadily decreasing. One hundred thirty five KC-135s use the JT3D, while 354 were fitted with CFM International CFM56 engines, which provide greater thrust, lower fuel consumption, and increased operational flexibility due to their lower noise footprint. The noise of the JT3D is one of the reasons NATO has debated re-fitting their E-3 Sentry AWACS fleet, since the aircraft are subject to restrictions that aircraft with modern engines are not. Operational flexibility would be further increased due to the ability of higher power engines to increase the ceiling of the aircraft, extending the horizon for radar surveillance; for instance, RAF, French and Saudi E-3s routinely fly higher than NATO/USAF counterparts.

In 1961, the TF33-powered Boeing B-52H Stratofortress entered service. The "H" model of the B-52 was the only production variant of the heavy bomber to be fitted with turbofan engines, and is the only model remaining in United States Air Force service. It is expected to remain as a mainstay of the Air Force heavy bomber fleet until at least 2040, with options for replacing the 8 TF33 engines with more modern equivalents being considered. In April 2020, the USAF released a request for proposals for 608 commercial replacement engines, with the plan to award the contract in May 2021. In September 2021, the USAF announced that the TF33 would be replaced by the Rolls-Royce F130.

Variants

JT3D-1   thrust civil version, (Water injection optional)
JT3D-2  (TF33-P-3) 
JT3D-3 , (Water injection optional)
JT3D-3A (TF33-P-5) 
JT3D-3B  thrust civil version
JT3D-5A (TF33-P-7) , (Water injection optional)
JT3D-8A (TF33-P-7) , (Water injection optional)
JT3D-7  thrust civil version
JT3D-15  thrust civil version for the unbuilt 707-820
TF33-P-3   thrust for the Boeing B-52H Stratofortress
TF33-P-5   thrust for the Boeing KC-135 Stratotanker
TF33-P-7   thrust for the Lockheed C-141 Starlifter
TF33-P-9   thrust for the Boeing EC-135C and Boeing RC-135C
TF33-P-11   thrust for the Martin RB-57F Canberra
TF33-PW-100A   thrust for the Boeing E-3 Sentry

TF33-PW-102/A

TF33-PW-103

Applications

Civilian (JT3D)
 Boeing 707
 Boeing 720
 Douglas DC-8
 Shanghai Y-10
Military (TF33)
 Boeing B-52H Stratofortress
 Boeing C-18
 Boeing C-135 series
 EC-135
 KC-135D/E Stratotanker (re-engined from retired donor airliners)
 OC-135B Open Skies
 RC-135
 Boeing CC-137
 WC-135
 Boeing E-3 Sentry
 Boeing VC-137B/C Stratoliner
 Northrop Grumman E-8 Joint STARS
 Lockheed C-141 Starlifter
 Martin/General Dynamics RB-57F Canberra

Specifications (JT3D-8A / TF33-P-7)

See also

References

Bibliography

External links

Low-bypass turbofan engines
JT3D
1950s turbofan engines